Juicy Music is LISA's debut album, released on April 16, 2003. This is her first solo album after she left M-Flo in the spring of 2002.It debuted at #5 on the weekly albums chart with 19,236 copies sold. The album stayed in the Top 20 the next two weeks and on its fourth week, which accumulated with 42,814 copies sold.

Track listing

References

Release history

External links
LISA Official Discography Web Site
 Oricon Music Special
 HMV Album Release

2003 debut albums
LISA (Japanese musician, born 1974) albums
Avex Group albums